Huelo a soledad (English I smell the solitude) is the 17th studio album by Mexican pop singer Ana Gabriel. It was released in 2001. This album was nominated for Female Pop album of the Year in the Billboard Latin Music Awards, but lost to Jaci Velasquez's Mi Corazón.

Track listing

Tracks
 Miento a Mi Verdad 04:34
 Amado Mio 05:22
 Amigo Amante 05:15
 Huelo a Soledad (A Capella) 04:22
 Cinco Dias 04:06
 Amándote 04:16
 Tanto Amor 04:47
 Huelo a Soledad 04:20
 Desencuentro 03:47
 Me He Cansado de Ti 04:24
 Cuando Tienes Ganas 06:30

Bonus tracks
 12. Huelo a Soledad (Banda Version) 03:52 
 13. Huelo a Soledad (Ranchera Version) 04:02

Album charts

 Note: This release reached the #14 position in Billboard Latin Pop Albums staying for 3 weeks  and it reached the #26 position in the Billboard Top Latin Albums staying for 21 weeks in the chart.

Singles
 Huelo a Soledad reached #8 on Hot Latin Songs and #9 on Latin Pop Airplay.

Sales and certifications

References

2001 albums
2002 albums
Ana Gabriel albums